"When There's No You" is a song written by Les Reed and Jackie Rae and performed by Engelbert Humperdinck.  The  melody was adapted from the music of Ruggero Leoncavallo's opera Pagliacci.  The single was Humperdinck's second of four number ones on the Easy Listening chart in the US, reaching number one in April 1971. On the Billboard Hot 100, "When There's No You" peaked at number forty-five.

See also
List of number-one adult contemporary singles of 1971 (U.S.)

References

1971 singles
Engelbert Humperdinck songs
Songs written by Jackie Rae
Songs written by Les Reed (songwriter)
1971 songs